Travesia station is a railway station located on the South Main Line in Albay, Philippines.

History
Travesia was built around 1981 as a replacement for the Guinobatan station after a bypass line was built to avoid the steep grades at Camalig. However, it was not until February 23, 1986 when services resumed and the station opened.

Railway stations in Albay
Railway stations opened in 1981
Railway stations in the Philippines